The Italian Coast Guard Air Service was established in 1989 by the Corps of the Port Captaincies – Coast Guard.

List of Italian Coast Guard aircraft and helicopters

References 

Corps of the Port Captaincies – Coast Guard